Actimel (known as DanActive in the United States and Canada) is a probiotic yogurt-type drink produced by the French company Danone. 

Actimel earned over €1.4 billion (US$1.8 billion) in retail sales in 2006.

History 
Actimel was invented in the 1980s when the first steps to developing a fermented milk based on Lactobacillus casei were already taken. 

It wasn’t until 1994 when it was commercially-launched in Belgium. The word Actimel was derived from the Flemish “Actieve melk” which translates simply as Active Milk.

Scientific basis 
Claimed benefits range from reducing the incidence of diarrhea and rhinitis reduction for young children, to  improvement of the immune function in adults and seniors
 and reduction of duration of winter infections for elderly.

A 2007 study published by the British Medical Journal suggests that the product could help avoid antibiotic–associated diarrhoea and limit Clostridium difficile colitis infections in elderly patients.

Debates surrounding health claims on probiotic foods

On 23 January 2008, a proposed class action was filed in California, accusing Danone Co. Inc. of false advertising in their marketing of yogurt containing probiotic bacteria (Danactive & Activia), alleging that the claimed health benefits have never been proven. The company has denied this accusation.

Foodwatch claims that Danone "makes a mountain out of a molehill" in suggesting that Actimel protects from cold and boosts health. Foodwatch believes that the company sells a commodity product as a niche product using branding.

The Advertising Standards Authority (ASA) is an independent regulator for advertisements, sales promotion and direct marketing in the UK. According to Spiegel Online one TV spot from Actimel was blocked by the ASA in 2006 and one in 2008.  In the first case the ASA upheld a complaint that the advert misleadingly implied that children given Actimel would be prevented from catching bacterial infections.  Meanwhile in the second case complaints about the use of the phrase "Actimel is scientifically proven and you can see that proof for yourself on our website" were upheld as only summaries of, or references to, these studies were present on the website and the full content was not available. A TV advert that stated that Actimel was "scientifically-proven to help support your kids' defences" was banned by the Advertising Standards Authority.

Alexa Meyer, from the Department of Nutritional Sciences, University of Vienna, Austria, comparing probiotic drinks and normal yogurt, found no significant difference in the effect of Actimel and normal yogurt with living bacteria. The nutritional researcher recommends getting enough sleep, washing hands often and eating a daily bowl of yogurt. She says this would activate more active germ-fighting white blood cells, enhancing the immune system, probably due to the presence of Lactobacillus bulgaricus, from any normal yogurt, which is half the price of Actimel.

The equivalence of yogurts is supported by Berthold Koletzko from the University of Munich, Metabolic Diseases and Nutrition. In case of diarrhoea, Koletzko advises parents to give their children yogurt with living bacteria. It does not necessarily need to be Actimel, but may also be other yogurts.  A measurable health benefit linked to the presence of live Streptococcus thermophilus and Lactobacillus delbrueckii sp. Bulgaricus in yogurt was reported by Koletzko and colleagues in 2005. In this review Koletzko and colleagues say that it was clearly demonstrated that yogurt containing viable bacteria improves lactose digestion and eliminates symptoms of lactose intolerance, and clearly fulfill the current concept of probiotics.

The net "all-cause" effects of yogurts have also been questioned; its 6 September 2009 issue, Nature featured an article by Didier Raoult who claimed that "probiotic-enriched" yogurt beverages may have contributed to the increase in obesity over the past 20 years.

Within the 27 countries of the European Union, a new health claims regulation was put in place by the European Commission as of 1 July 2007. In Canada, a similar regulation is currently in the works at Health Canada.

References

External links
 
 

Brand name yogurts
Groupe Danone brands
Products introduced in 1994
1994 introductions
1994 establishments in Belgium